Lope K. Santos (born Lope Santos y Canseco, September 25, 1879 – May 1, 1963) was a Filipino Tagalog-language writer and former senator of the Philippines. He is best known for his 1906 socialist novel, Banaag at Sikat and to his contributions for the development of Filipino grammar and Tagalog orthography.

Lope K. Santos was born in Pasig, Province of Manila (now a part of Metro Manila) as Lope Santos y Canseco to Ladislao Santos, a native of Pasig, and Victorina Canseco, a native of San Mateo, on September 25, 1879. He was raised in Pandacan. His father was imprisoned during Philippine Revolution because Spanish authorities found copies of José Rizal's Noli Me Tangere and Ang Kalayaan in his possession.

Santos was sent to Escuela Normal Superior de Maestros (Higher Normal School for Teachers) for education and later finished schooling at Colegio Filipino. During Philippine Revolution of 1896, Santos joined revolutionaries. By the time of the death of his mother, she requested Lope to marry Simeona Salazar. Marriage happened on February 10, 1900 and they were blessed with three children namely Lakambini, Luwalhati and Makaaraw.

He pursued law at the Academia de la Jurisprudencia then at Escuela de Derecho de Manila (now Manila Law College Foundation) where he received Bachelor of Arts degree in 1912. In late 1900, Santos started writing his own newspaper Ang Kaliwanagan. This was also the time when socialism becomes an emerging idea in world ideology. When José Ma. Dominador Goméz was charged and sentenced by the Supreme Court of sedition and illegal association against the government in 1903, Goméz's labor group Union Obrera Democratica Filipina (Philippine Democratic Labor Union) was absorbed by Santos. The group was renamed as Union del Trabajo de Filipinas, but was later dissolved in 1907.

In 1903, Santos started publishing fragments of his first novel, Banaag at Sikat (From Early Dawn to Full Light) on his weekly labor magazine Muling Pagsilang (The Rebirth) and was completed in 1906. When published in book form, Santos' Banaag at Sikat was then considered the first socialist-oriented book in the Philippines that expounded principles of socialism and sought labor reforms from the government. The book later became an inspiration for the assembly of the 1932 Socialist Party of the Philippines and then the 1946 group Hukbalahap.

Santos became expert in dupluhan, a form of poetical debate during that time. Dupluhan can be compared to balagtasan, which became popular half a century before Santos' time. He also founded Sampaguita, a weekly lifestyle magazine.

In early 1910s, he started a campaign to promote a '"national language for the Philippines", where he organized various symposia and lectures and headed numerous departments for national language in leading Philippine universities. In 1910, he was elected governor of the province of Rizal under the Nacionalista Party. In 1918, he was appointed as the first Filipino governor of the newly resurveyed Nueva Vizcaya until 1920. Consequently, he was appointed to the 5th Philippine Legislature as senator from the twelfth senatorial district representing provinces having a majority of non-Christian population. He was the primary author of Philippine Legislature Act No. 2946 which enacted November 30 every year as Bonifacio Day, honoring Andrés Bonifacio. He resigned from the Senate in 1921.

In 1940, Santos published the first grammar book of the "national language", Balarila ng Wikang Pambansa (Grammar of the National Language) which was commissioned by the Surian ng Wikang Pambansa (SWF). The next year, he was appointed by President Manuel L. Quezon as director of SWF until 1946. When the Philippines became a member of the United Nations he was selected to translate the 1935 Constitution for UNESCO. He was also appointed to assist for the translation of inaugural addresses of presidents Jose P. Laurel and Manuel A. Roxas.

In early 1960s, he underwent liver operations due to complication. Santos died on May 1, 1963.

Works

The works of Santos include the following:

 Banaag at Sikat (From Early Dawn to Full Light), 1903–06, first literary novel in Tagalog that incorporates socialist ideas and the works of the united associations of laborers.<ref name=NCCA>Quindoza-Santiago, Lilia (Dr.)  Philippine Culture during the American Period), Publications about Culture and Arts, About Culture and Arts, ncca.gov.ph, 2002]</ref>
 Ag̃ "Pag̃gig̃gera" (Tulag̃ Handog sa Kababaiga'g̃ Tagalog) (The "Paḡgiḡgera" (A Poem for Tagalog Women)), 1912, paḡgiḡgera is a form of early 20th century gambling.
 Kundanḡan...!: Nobelang Tagalog Katha (Deference...!: A Tagalog Novel), 1927, Santos' second literary novel.
 Tinḡíng Pahapáw sa Kasaysayan ñg Pámitikang Tagalog (Few Points in the History of Tagalog Literature), 1938
 Puso't Diwa (Heart and Spirit), three volume book collection of chosen poems of Santos during American period.
 Sino Ka? Ako'y Si... 60 Sagot na mga Tulá (Who Are You? I am... 60 Answering Poems), 1946, collection of philosophical poems.
 Mga Hamak na Dakilà: 60 Tulâ (Mean Magnificent: 60 poems), 1950, humorous collection of war-period poems.
 "Makábagong" Balarilà?: Mga Puná at Payo sa "Sariling Wikà" ("Modern" Grammar?: Views and Advices for "National Language"), 1951, written in cooperation with Surian ng Wikang Pambansa director Cirilo H. Panganiban.

References

 Lope K. Santos (1879–1963)
 Lope K. Santos – Father of the Filipino Grammar: Fighting for National Identity
 Herbert, Patricia. [https://books.google.com/books?id=-EqbeRzdDrsC South-East Asia: languages and literatures : a select guide, 1989
 Panganiban, Jose Villa. Panitikan ng Pilipinas, 1982
 San Juan, Epifanio. Introduction to modern Pilipino literature, 1974
 Saulo, Alfredo. Communism in the Philippines: an introduction'', 1990
 Ano ang babae? tula/ Lope K. Santos

See also

Norberto Romualdez

1879 births
1963 deaths
20th-century Filipino poets
Filipino novelists
20th-century Filipino lawyers
Governors of Rizal
Governors of Nueva Vizcaya
Filipino socialists
Nacionalista Party politicians
Senators of the 5th Philippine Legislature
People from Pasig
Filipino Freemasons
Writers from Metro Manila
Politicians from Metro Manila
Burials at the Manila South Cemetery
Filipino male poets
20th-century male writers
Tagalog-language writers
Members of the Philippine Independent Church